Samson Morpurgo ben Joshua Moses (1681 – 12 April 1740) was an Italian rabbi, physician, and liturgist.

Morpurgo was born in Gradisca d'Isonzo, close to Gorizia.  When a boy of seven he was taken by his father to Venice, where he received his elementary education. He then studied in the University of Padua, and graduated as doctor of medicine.

In 1704 Morpurgo published in Venice his "'Eẓ ha-Da'at," a philosophical commentary on Jedaiah Bedersi's "Beḥinat ha-'Olam." At the end of this work was printed a satire upon the cabalists by Jacob Frances, on account of which Morpurgo was persecuted by the rabbis of Padua. At the same time he devoted himself to the study of the Talmud and rabbinics, and in 1709 he obtained a rabbi's diploma from Leon Briel, chief rabbi of Mantua (Preface to Morpurgo's "Shemesh Ẓedaḳah"). Soon afterward he was associated in the rabbinate of Ancona with Joseph Fiametta, whose son-in-law he subsequently became. After Fiametta's death (1721) Morpurgo was sole rabbi of Ancona; and he continued in office till his death.

Morpurgo enjoyed much consideration as a distinguished rabbi; his objections to certain rabbinical decrees are to be found in Giovanni Bernardo De Rossi, "Bibliotheca Antichristiana," p. 63; and an approbation of his, of 1716, was inserted by Isaac Lampronti in his "Paḥad Yiẓaḳ," i. 35b, s.v. . He corresponded with Abraham Segre and Moses Ḥagiz concerning Moses Ḥayyim Luzzatto (see "Kerem Ḥemed," iii. 149). Morpurgo proved a skilful physician during an epidemic of influenza at Ancona in 1730; and in recognition of his services he was presented with a testimonial by Pope Benedict XIV, who was Archbishop of Ancona. He died at Ancona.

Morpurgo left a number of responsa on the four parts of the Shulḥan 'Aruk, which were published, with notes and preface, by his son Moses Ḥayyim Shabbethai (Venice, 1743). He was also the author of a prayer beginning "Anna ha-El ha-Gadol ha-Gibbor weha-Nora," to be recited by persons visiting the cemetery.

References
Eliakim Carmoly, in Revue Orientale, ii. 473; 
Julius Fürst, Bibl. Jud. ii. 391; 
Marco Mortara, Indice, p. 42; 
Giovanni Bernardo De Rossi, Dizionario, ii. 64; 
Moritz Steinschneider, Cat. Bodl. col. 2637; 
Zunz, Literaturgesch. p. 448; 
idem, in Liebermann, Deutscher Volkskalender, 1853, p. 68

External links
Source

 Signature of Samson Morpurgo (Rare Books of the Shimeon Brisman Collection in Jewish Studies, Washington University)

1671 births
1740 deaths
18th-century Italian rabbis
University of Padua alumni
18th-century Jewish physicians
Rabbis from Ancona